Vahan M. Kurkjian (1863–1961) was an Armenian author, historian, teacher, and community leader.

In 1904, in Cairo, he published the Armenian newspaper Loussaper (The Morning Star), in the pages of which he and other intellectuals called for a national union for the Armenian people. The idea eventually materialized in the form of the Armenian General Benevolent Union. In 1907 he emigrated to the United States and studied law at Boston University. Two years later, also in Boston, he founded the first American chapter of the Armenian General Benevolent Union. From its inception he was inseparably identified with that organization, serving as its executive director until his retirement in 1939. Kurkjian was a frequent contributor of articles to Armenian newspapers, and published a number of books and pamphlets, among which the best-remembered is his History of Armenia.

Editions
A History of Armenia
Armenian General Benevolent Union of America, 1964
Indo-European Publishing, 2008,

External links 
History of Armenia by Vahan M. Kurkjian

People from Aleppo
Armenians from the Ottoman Empire
Emigrants from the Ottoman Empire to the United States
Ethnic Armenian historians
American writers of Armenian descent
Boston University School of Law alumni
1863 births
1961 deaths
19th-century Armenian historians
19th-century journalists from the Ottoman Empire
19th-century historians from the Ottoman Empire